ICT Group, Inc. was a multinational call center and outsourcing company based in the Philadelphia suburb of Newtown.

During the global financial crisis of 2008–2009, it began closing call centers in the United States and Canada, and reducing staff numbers in the United Kingdom, Ireland and Australia, as part of a plan to move its operations to lower-wage countries.

On February 2, 2010, ICT was officially acquired by Sykes Enterprises, Inc., a Tampa-based company.

References

Outsourcing companies